Benim Hala Umudum Var is a Turkish television drama starring Gizem Karaca, Berk Oktay and Şükrü Özyıldız. It was broadcast on Star TV, and later on Fox TV between 2013 and 2014. The series is written by Deniz Akçay. The story takes place in one of the modest neighborhoods of İstanbul, following the life of a 23 year old woman, Umut (Gizem Karaca). Her life takes a turn when she meets Ozan (Şükrü Özyıldız), an energetic and attractive young man at a hair salon. Suddenly, her life changes into something she has only seen on the theater stage or in movies.

Cast

Series overview

International broadcasters

References

External links
Benim Hala Umudum Var (2013) at Star TV (Turkey)
Benim Hala Umudum Var (2013)

2013 Turkish television series debuts
Turkish drama television series
Television series by Gold Film
Star TV (Turkey) original programming
Fox (Turkish TV channel) original programming
Television series produced in Istanbul
Television shows set in Istanbul
Television series set in the 2010s